Hermann Seeger (15 October 1857 – 23 February 1945) was a German genre and landscape painter. Seeger was also known as a talented engraver.

Biography 
Hermann Seeger was born at Halberstadt. At the age of 18, he moved to Halle to study philosophy, but eventually, Seeger turned to art and enrolled at the Berlin Academy. He graduated it in 1885. His most renowned works were painted in the coastal villages of Baltic Sea.

Personal life 
Seeger met his wife Marie Cramer in Berlin. They had four children. His daughters Hildegard and Ilse were often taking part in the painting process as his models in the beach scenes.

References
 Seeger's works in exhibition
 Biography

1857 births
1945 deaths
People from Halberstadt
19th-century German painters
19th-century German male artists
German male painters
Genre painters
Landscape painters